Sandston is a census-designated place (CDP) in Henrico County, Virginia, United States, just outside the state capital of Richmond. The population as of the 2010 Census was 7,571. It was designated a Historic District by Henrico County in 2021.

The Battle of Seven Pines took place nearby in 1862. It was second only to the Battle of Shiloh in its number of casualties up to that time. The battle was brutally fought and inconclusive, but had a profound impact on the trajectory of the war. After General Johnston's injury, President Jefferson Davis appointed Robert E. Lee as Commander of the Confederate Armies. Lee then initiated the Seven Days Battles, which drove the Northern forces into a retreat in late June. This was the closest the North had come to Richmond, Virginia in this offensive.

During World War I, a number of homes were built in the area for both non-commissioned officers and enlisted men. After the war, an investment group headed by Oliver J. Sands bought the land and buildings as surplus property. The community was named Sandston after Oliver Sands, the president of the Richmond and Fairfield Railway, the electric street railway line which ran through Highland Springs and Fair Oaks to the National Cemetery at Seven Pines.

The community was later served by the Fairfield Transit Company, which operated a bus barn extant at Seven Pines in 2005 and the earlier trolley car barn in Richmond on North 29th Street. The road from Richmond, through Highland Springs, to Seven Pines was named "Nine Mile Road" because of the distance of the streetcar/trolley line.

References

Census-designated places in Henrico County, Virginia
Census-designated places in Virginia